Charles Duncan (1823  1891) was a Scottish-born stonemason in Utah.  He worked on his own and with sons, sometimes known as Charles Duncan and Sons, building numerous stone houses and culverts around Davis County, Utah, and he contributed to the construction of the Salt Lake Temple.

With son John Samuel Duncan, he built the John, Harriet, and Eliza Jennett Duncan House in Centerville, Utah around 1873.  It is one of a number of his works listed on the National Register of Historic Places.

Duncan helped build the Salt Lake Temple during the portion of its construction from 1863 to 1867.

Duncan was born in 1823 in Dysart, Fifeshire, Scotland and in 1844 he married Margaret Bowman; they lived in Dysart where Charles was employed as a stone cutter and rock mason.

The family came from Liverpool to New Orleans by the January to March 1852 voyage of the ship Kennebec; records show Duncans with first names Charles, Margaret, Isabell, Janet, another Margaret, were on board.

Works
Osmyn and Emily Deuel House, 271 South 200 East Centerville, UT (Duncan, Charles, and Sons), NRHP-listed
John, Harriet, and Eliza Jennett Duncan House (c.1873), 445 North 400 East Centerville, UT Duncan, Charles and John), NRHP-listed
Harris--Tingey House, 269 E. Center St. Centerville, UT Duncan, Charles), NRHP-listed
Kilbourn--Leak House, 170 North 200 East Centerville, UT Duncan, Charles, and Sons), NRHP-listed
B.H. Roberts Louisa Smith and Cecilia Dibble, 315 South 300 East Centerville, UT Duncan, Charles, and Sons), NRHP-listed
William Henry and Mary Streeper House, 1020 N. Main St. Centerville, UT Duncan, Charles), NRHP-listed
Thomas and Elizabeth Mills Whitaker House, 168 N. Main St. Centerville, UT Duncan, Charles, and Sons), NRHP-listed
Young Men's Hall--Tingey House, 85 South 300 East Centerville, UT Duncan, Charles E., and Sons), NRHP-listed

References

American stonemasons
1823 births
1891 deaths
19th-century Scottish people
People from Utah